The Political Film Society Award for exposé is given out each year to a film that has an investigative depth into a subject matter and often exposes surprising information on the subject.  This award has been handed out by the Society since 1988.  Depending on the number of films that qualify, as few as one films has been nominated for this award before but as many as fourteen have been nominated in years past.

The film that first won this award was A Cry in the Dark in 1988 that was directed by Fred Schepisi. The award, as with any other Political Film Society Award, can go to a mainstream film, independent film, or even an international film.  The Political Film Society looks at a broad selection of films before it nominates them for an award.

1980s
1988 A Cry in the Dark
 The Milagro Beanfield War
 Patty Hearst
1989 Scandal
 Blaze

1990s
1990 Roger & Me
 Air America
 Reversal of Fortune
 Romero
1991 Guilty by Suspicion
 Boyz n the Hood
 JFK
 Paris Is Burning
1992 Hoffa
 Malcolm X
 Thunderheart
1993 In the Name of the Father
 Rising Sun
 Schindler's List
 Short Cuts
1994 Quiz Show
1995 Nixon
 Beyond Rangoon
 Panther
1996 Dead Man Walking
1997 Rosewood
 Amistad
 The Peacemaker
 Seven Years in Tibet
1998 
Bulworth
A Civil Action
Four Days in September
Regeneration
1999 Boys Don't Cry
Bastards
Cabaret Balkan
East of Hope Street
The Insider
Naturally Native
One Man's Hero
Three Kings
Three Seasons

2000s
2000 Before Night Falls
But I'm a Cheerleader
Catfish in Black Bean Sauce
Erin Brockovich
From the Edge of the City
The Hurricane
It All Starts Today
Luminarias
Remember the Titans
Steal This Movie!
Thirteen Days
Tigerland
Titanic Town
Traffic
X-Men
2001 Uprising
Ali
Baby Boy
Behind Enemy Lines
Born under Libra
Bread and Roses
Greenfingers
The Hidden Half
The Iron Ladies
Journey to the Sun
Lumumba
Our Lady of the Assassins
2002 Antwone Fisher
Ararat
Circuit
Enigma
Evelyn
Green Dragon
The Grey Zone
John Q
K-19: The Widowmaker
Kandahar
Max
Rabbit-Proof Fence
To End All Wars
Tricky Life
Y Tu Mamá También
2003 Veronica Guerin
All My Loved Ones
Amen.
Beyond Borders
La Casa de Los Babys
Dark Blue
The Dancer Upstairs
Dirty Pretty Things
Emerald Cowboy
Green Card Fever
Herod's Law
Lilja 4-Ever
The Magdalene Sisters
Marooned in Iraq
Runaway Jury
Sandstorm
Shattered Glass
The Statement
Taking Sides
Tycoon: A New Russian
2004 Kinsey
Carandiru
The Day After Tomorrow
The Gatekeeper
Hotel Rwanda
Imagining Argentina
The Motorcycle Diaries
Osama
Rosenstrasse
Tae Guk Ki
The Yes Men
2005 Good Night, and Good Luck
Before the Fall
Crash
Downfall
The Great Water
Innocent Voices
Lord of War
Machuca
Munich
The Ninth Day
North Country
Paradise Now
Turtles Can Fly
2006 Kekexili: Mountain Patrol
Cautiva
Fast Food Nation
Glory Road
The Good Shepherd
The Listening
The Queen
The Road to Guantánamo
Sophie Scholl – The Final Days
2007 American Gangster
Amu
Bamako
Beyond the Gates
Black Book
Black Friday
Charlie Wilson's War
The Great Debaters
Holly
The Hunting Party
A Mighty Heart
Persepolis
Redacted
September Dawn
The Situation
There Will Be Blood
Trade
The Wind That Shakes the Barley
2008 
The Bank Job
Battle in Seattle
Changeling
Che
The Counterfeiters
Defiance
Frost/Nixon
Milk
Miracle at St. Anna
Still Life
W.
Walkyrie
2009 Fifty Dead Men Walking
12
The Baader Meinhof Complex
The Cove
Flame & Citron
The Hurt Locker
Invictus
The Last Station
Punctured Hope
Sin Nombre
Skin
State of Play
Storm
The Stoning of Soraya M.
The Sun
The Yes Men Fix the World
The Young Victoria

2010s
2010 Shake Hands with the Devil
Agora
Casino Jack
Extraordinary Measures
Fair Game
Formosa Betrayed
John Rabe
Mao's Last Dancer
Princess Ka`iulani
Vincere
2011 Silenced
5 Days of War
Amigo
The Bang Bang Club
City of Life and Death
The Conquest
The Conspirator
The Devil's Double
Elite Squad 2: The Enemy Within
J. Edgar
Kinyarwanda
Machine Gun Preacher
Oranges and Sunshine
The Whistleblower
2012 Argo
Compliance
For Greater Glory
Lula, Son of Brazil
Mulberry Child
2013 Emperor
Aftermath
Dallas Buyers Club
A Dark Truth
The Fifth Estate
The Reluctant Fundamentalist
Saving Lincoln
2014 Difret
Bethlehem
Bhopal: A Prayer for Rain
Cesar Chavez
Coldwater
Giovanni's Island
The Imitation Game
Kill the Messenger
The Last Sentence
The Monuments Men
Omar
Pride
The Railway Man
Rosewater
Siddhart
Walking with the Enemy
2015 Experimenter
Bridge of Spies
Heneral Luna
Jimmy's Hall
Labyrinth of Lies
Midterranea
Noble
Spotlight
Straight Outta Compton
The Danish Girl
The Girl King
Trumbo
Truth
Woman in Gold
2016 War Dogs
Denial
Free State of Jones
I, Daniel Blake
The Innocents
Land of Mine
The People v Fritz Bauer
Race
The Siege of Jadoville
Silence
Snowden
Tanna
2017 War Machine
15 Minutes
All the Money in the World
Alone in Berlin
Bitter Harvest
Darkest House
Detroit
The Divine Hour
The King's Choice
Mark Feld
Marshall
The Pirates of Somalia
The Post
Tickling Giants
Tom of Finland
A United Kingdom
Victoria & Abdul
The Zookeeper's Wife
2018 Boy Erased
BlacKkKlansman
Chappaquiddick
55 Steps
The Front Runner
Green Book
On the Basis of Sex
Outlaw King
22 July
Vice
The Young Karl Marx
2019 15 Minutes of War and The Invisibles
Ashes in the Snow
Brian Banks
Capernaum
Dark Waters
Go for Broke
Harriet
I Do Not Care If We Go Down in History as Barbarians
The Innocents
Just Mercy
Mob Town
Official Secrets
Red Joan
The Report
Richard Jewell
Seberg
Skin
Saint Judy
The Two Popes

2020s
2020 
The Banker
Burden
Sorry We Missed You
2021 Wife of a Spy
American Traitor
Betrayed
Blue Bayou
The Courier
De Gaulle
Held for Ransom
Hive
The Last Duel
The Last Forest
Margrete: Queen of the North
Operation Curveball
Peepal Tree
The Last Duel
The Rescue
2022 She Said
Donbass
Emancipation
Holy Spider
Operation Mincemeat
Unsilenced

See also
Political Film Society Award for Democracy
Political Film Society Award for Human Rights
Political Film Society Award for Peace

References

External links

Political Film Society
Awards established in 1988